Sir James Thomas Walter Charles KBE CB RD RNR (2 August 1865 – 16 July 1928) was a noted British ocean liner captain and later Commodore of the Cunard Steamship Company.

He first went to sea at 15 in 1880 sailing on barques around Cape Horn South Africa. At Cunard he rose through the ranks and commanded the RMS Lusitania and RMS Mauretania, among others, before and during World War I. In March 1918 he was given command of the RMS Aquitania. He was knighted for his wartime service in 1920 and made Commodore of the Cunard Line in 1921. He was due to retire on 2 August 1928 when he was stricken with an internal hemorrhage while in command of the Aquitania on a return voyage to Southampton.

Death
Sir James' final voyage was on the Aquitania. In his career, he had made 726 transatlantic voyages. At New York, there was little turn around time and he spoke of having to spend much time on the bridge due to fog. At Cherbourg, his officer tried to persuade him to rest and allow his second, a Staff Captain Dolphin, to dock the ship. After Cherbourg, the ship made its way to Southampton and Sir James felt more inclined to allow the receiving pilot to take charge of the Aquitania. He reluctantly agreed to rest in the chartroom where he was taken ill with hemorrhage. When the Aquitania docked, his wife was summoned and he was taken to hospital where he was pronounced dead. The Commodore's flag was lowered to half-mast announcing his passing to the passengers.

References

External links
 Sir James Charles with Admiral David Beatty in 1922 on the Aquitania

1865 births
1928 deaths
English sailors
Steamship captains
Royal Navy officers
British Merchant Navy officers
British Merchant Service personnel of World War I
Companions of the Order of the Bath
Knights Commander of the Order of the British Empire